Sir John Hanmer, 1st Baronet (1590–1624) was an English politician who sat in the House of Commons in 1624.

Hanmer was the eldest son of Sir Thomas Hanmer, who was MP for Flintshire in 1593.

He was a member of the Council of Wales and the Marches, and was a leader of the Puritan party. He was created baronet on 8 July 1620.

In 1624, Hanmer was elected Member of Parliament for Flintshire. He died later in the year at the age of 33.

Hanmer married Dorothy Trevor, daughter of Sir Richard Trevor of Allington. His son Thomas succeeded to the baronetcy and was also MP for Flint and Flintshire.

References

1590 births
1624 deaths
Members of the Parliament of England (pre-1707) for constituencies in Wales
Baronets in the Baronetage of England
People from Flintshire
Place of birth missing
English MPs 1624–1625